Tsehafi Taezaz Aklilu Habte-Wold (12 March 1912 – 23 November 1974) was an Ethiopian politician under Emperor Haile Selassie. He was foreign minister of Ethiopia from 1947 to 1958 and Prime Minister from 1961 until his death by the Derg execution in 1974.

Life 
Aklilu Habte-Wold was the son of a rural Ethiopian Orthodox priest from the Bulga district of Shewa province. He and his brothers, Makonnen Habte-Wold and Akalework Habte-Wold benefited from the patronage of Emperor Haile Selassie, who had them educated. Aklilu Habte-Wold attended the French lycee in Alexandria, then afterwards studied in France.

Upon returning to Ethiopia, Aklilu became the protégé of the powerful Tsehafi Taezaz ("Minister of the Pen") Wolde Giyorgis Wolde Yohannes, another man of humble birth, who had become a powerful figure in Ethiopian government, and a close advisor to the Emperor, with his appointment as Tsehafi Taezaz. Wolde Giyorgis recommended the sons of Habte-Wold to the Emperor, who promoted them through the ranks so that the two eldest, Makonnen and Aklilu, became particularly influential with the monarch. Their humble origins, and the fact that they owed their education and advancement solely to the Emperor, allowed Emperor Haile Selassie to trust them implicitly and to favor them and other commoners of humble origin in government appointments and high positions at the expense of the aristocracy, whose loyalty to his person, rather than to the institution of Emperor he suspected. The Emperor's preference for such men as Aklilu Habte-Wold over the high nobles created resentment among the aristocracy, who believed they were being displaced by these new western educated "technocrats".

When Ethiopia was defeated in the Second Italo-Abyssinian War, Aklilu Habte-Wold was in France with his brother Makonnen; upon the defection of the head of the Ethiopian legation to France, Blatengeta Wolde Mariyam Ayele, Aklilu was made charge d'affairs. Aklilu lived in Paris and married a French woman, Collette Valade. With the fall of Paris in June 1940, Aklilu managed to escape on a forged passport, and with the help of the Portuguese Minister of Foreign Affairs he was able to reach Cairo.  Following the restoration in 1941, Aklilu served as a representative to the Peace conference after the end of World War II, then served as Foreign Minister. During this time, Aklilu played a key role in the complex process that brought Eritrea into federation with Ethiopia.

Premiereship
Following the fall from favor of Tsehafi Taezaz Wolde Giyorgis in 1958, the Emperor appointed Aklilu to replace him as Tsehafi Taezaz. In April 1961, four months after the previous Prime Minister Abebe Aragai had been killed in a failed coup, the Emperor promoted Aklilu Habte-Wold to that office, while retaining the powerful office of Tsehafi Taezaz in his portfolio. These two posts gave Aklilu a level of confidence with the Emperor that no one outside of the Imperial Family shared.

This appointment, and the following increase of commoner "technocrats" in positions of power and influence greatly disturbed the more conservative elements in the Imperial Family, the aristocracy, and the Ethiopian Church. Two camps evolved at court, with Prime Minister Aklilu and his fellow non-noble "technocrats" on one side, who dominated the various ministries and the Imperial Cabinet, against the nobility who were represented by the Crown Council, and led by Ras Asrate Medhin Kassa. Although the Emperor forbade party politics, the two rival camps behaved as such, and maneuvered against each other rather vigorously. Many issues such as land reform and constitutional change were blocked largely because of this rivalry. On the other hand, Bahru Zewde is of the opinion that "Aklilu's impact on Ethiopian politics is not so easily identifiable. He lacked the capacity for political manipulation shown by his predecessor as tsahafe t'ezaz, Walda-Giyorgis, and his own brother, Makonnen. Aklilu was more of a leading functionary than a power-broker." Former diplomat Paul B. Henze supports this view that Aklilu was not interested in reform, but repeats Aklilu's rival Ras Asrate's opinion that "Aklilu was the primary reactionary influence on the Emperor." On the other hand, John Spencer, who knew Aklilu personally, described him as "a remarkably clear and logical thinker and a formidable antagonist in encounters with foreign representatives." Spencer further explains that Aklilu's ability was limited due, to the favoritism Emperor Haile Selassie showed him, which led to resentment and isolation from his compatriots. "In that isolation his power and stature declined in direct ratio to that of His Majesty," Spencer notes, concluding that with his brother Makonnen's death in the 1960 Ethiopian coup attempt, he lost a vital window into the psychological reactions and secret movements of his peers.

1974 revolution
When student protests, military mutinies and an economic downturn caused by the oil embargo erupted in 1973 into a popular uprising against the government, calls went out for Prime Minister Aklilu to be dismissed. On 23 February, then the next day, the Emperor made a number of concessions to the various groups of protesters.

Meanwhile, Aklilu had grown frustrated and weary of holding a position with much responsibility but no authority. John Spencer offers one example, only a few months prior to this crisis, of Aklilu's loss of power:
 In foreign affairs where, for decades, his views were uncontested, he was now confronted by Minister of Foreign Affairs Minassie Haile, who did not share his views on foreign policy. For Minassie, it was sufficient to go to His Majesty to obtain a compliant authorization of an opposite line of action. A case in point ... was whether or not the Emperor should make an urgent visit to Riyadh to consult with King Faisal. Ill-advisedly, Aklilou accepted a show-down in front of His Majesty. Aklilou lost. Without a constituency, with only a vacillating monarch to turn to, Aklilou expressed to me his concern for the future.

By the time of the popular uprising, Aklilu Habte-Wold had resolved to resign, a decision opposed by Lt. General Abiye Abebe and Leul Ras Asrate Kassa. Both criticized him for abandoning the government without first having safeguarded authority, law and order in this situation. Nevertheless, Aklilu persisted in his decision, although he recommended Lt. General Abiye be his successor; however when he resigned it was Endelkachew Makonnen who became the new Prime Minister. Aklilu's resignation, instead of placating the protesters, this resignation only emboldened them to make further demands.

The Crown Council had pushed the Emperor to appoint a nobleman to the position, and initially Lt. General Abiye Abebe was favored to be named the new Prime Minister. However and when General Abiye's request that he be made responsible to the elected parliament rather than the Emperor was presented, the Council balked and the General asked to be dropped from consideration. Lij Endelkachew Makonnen, son of the late former Prime Minister, was appointed. The new Premier attempted to address the many demands being put forward by the proponents of reform, and Ethiopia seemed to be on the verge of transforming itself into a democracy and a modern constitutional monarchy. However, a committee of low ranking officers called the Derg, who had been empowered to investigate corruption in the military, arrested Tsehafi Taezaz Aklilu and most of the men who had served in his cabinet, as well as the new Prime Minister and his cabinet. The Derg deposed Emperor Haile Selassie on 12 September 1974 and assumed power as the Marxist military junta that would rule the country for almost two decades.

On the evening of 23 November, Tsehafi Taezaz Aklilu Habte-Wold, and his brother Akalework Habte-Wold were removed from Menelik Palace and taken to Akaki Central Prison where they were summarily executed with 60 other ex-officials of the Emperor's government. This act led to protests around the world, not only from Europe and the United States, but also from a number of African countries who expressed their concern for the well-being of the deposed Emperor.

Notes 

1912 births
1974 deaths
World War II political leaders
Prime Ministers of Ethiopia
Foreign ministers of Ethiopia
Government ministers of Ethiopia
Grand Crosses 1st class of the Order of Merit of the Federal Republic of Germany
Ethiopian nobility
Executed Ethiopian people
20th-century Ethiopian politicians